

Seasons

References

James Madison

James Madison Dukes football seasons